Tha Song Yang is the northwesternmost district (amphoe) of Tak province, western Thailand.

History
Tha Song Yang was a minor district (king amphoe) of Mae Sariang district, Mae Hong Son province. It was called Ban Mae Moei or Ban Mae Tawo (บ้านแม่เมย or บ้านแม่ตะวอ). The district office was at Tambon Tha Song Yang.

In 1948 the government moved Tha Song Yang to be a subordinate of Mae Sot District, Tak Province. The following year the district office was moved to Tambon Mae Tan. In 1958 it was upgraded to a full district.

Etymology
Tha Song Yang means 'a river pier that has two Yang trees' (Dipterocarpus sp.). The name originates from the old location of the district office, where it had two Yang trees on both of the Moei River, one tree on the Burmese side and one on the Thai side.

Geography

Neighboring districts are (Northwest from clockwise): Sop Moei of Mae Hong Son province, Omkoi of Chiang Mai province and Mae Ramat of Tak province. The other side of the Moei River is Kayin State of Myanmar.

Mae Moei National Park is in Tha Song Yang.

The important river of the district is the Moei River.

Administration
The district is divided into six sub-districts (tambons), which are further subdivided into 56 villages (mubans). Mae Tan is a township (thesaban tambon) which covers parts of the tambon Mae Tan. There are a further six tambon administrative organizations (TAO).

References

External links
amphoe.com (Thai)
 Mae Moei National Park

Tha Song Yang